Chenderong Balai is a small town in Hilir Perak District in Perak, Malaysia.

Hilir Perak District
Towns in Perak